APZ may refer to:

 APZ, the dual processor system of the AXE telephone exchange
 Area Planning Zones in the Bangalore Metropolitan Region Development Authority
 IATA airport code for Zapala Airport
 Asoziale Parasiten-Zonen, in the Anarchist Pogo Party of Germany
 Asia Pacific Zone of the International Wine and Food Society
 Async Pan and Zoom function of Firefox OS
 APZ (Abnormal Mental States) questionnaire, a psychometric scale for assessing subjective experiences of altered states of consciousness